Executioner was an American thrash metal band from Boston, Massachusetts, that was active from 1984 to 1990.

History 
Executioner was formed in 1984. Their track "Victims of Evil" was issued on the compilation Speed Metal Hell in 1985. They were then signed to New Renaissance Records and recorded material throughout 1985, which was released as their debut album In the Name of Metal in 1986.

After a show in San Antonio, Texas. Ari punched a van and broke his hand and eventually flew home while Seth (who was their roadie at the time) and the other members of the band drove home. Ari ended up cutting his hair which lead to Marc kicking him out because he thought it would affect their image, he was replaced with a guy who swept floors at his uncle's hair salon, Seth ended up buying a white BC Rich Warlock bass and joined the band in Autumn 1986 after the hairdresser quit, and did some shows with them. In early 1987 the band recorded the "Break the Silence" album. They went on tour and played with bands such as The Accüsed, Voivod, Kreator, Dr. Know, Nuclear Assault, St. Vitus, Dream Death, The Mentors, etc.

In May 1988, Putnam left the band and was replaced by Tommy Flynn. With Flynn, they recorded material throughout 1988 and most of 1989, but shortly after the material was mixed, the band broke up. Had Executioner not broken up, the material was to have been called In Cold Blood and released in 1990.

In 1999, a CD called The Storm after the Calm was released, containing the tracks from the sessions in 1988 and 1989 and four faux-live tracks.

In 2013, In the Name of Metal was reissued on CD with bonus tracks, including "Final Destruction" (only available on cassette on the original release), the original recording of "Victims of Evil" and the faux-live of AC/DC's "Walk All Over You" from The Storm after the Calm. Later that year, Break the Silence was released on CD without any bonus material.

Discography 
 In the Name of Metal (1986)
 Break the Silence (1987)
 The Storm after the Calm (1999)

References

External links 
 Official website (last updated around The Storm after the Calm reissue)
 Executioner at Discogs
 Executioner at Encyclopaedia Metallum
 Executioner at Rate Your Music

Musical groups from Boston
American thrash metal musical groups